Virgile Barel (1889-1979) was a French Communist politician. He served as a member of the National Assembly from 1936 to 1940, from 1945 to 1951, from 1956 to 1958, and from 1967 to 1973. The Boulevard Virgile Barel in the Saint Roch neighbourhood of Nice was named in his honour.

References

1889 births
1973 deaths
People from Alpes-Maritimes
Politicians from Provence-Alpes-Côte d'Azur
French Communist Party politicians
Members of the 16th Chamber of Deputies of the French Third Republic
Members of the Constituent Assembly of France (1945)
Members of the Constituent Assembly of France (1946)
Deputies of the 1st National Assembly of the French Fourth Republic
Deputies of the 3rd National Assembly of the French Fourth Republic
Deputies of the 3rd National Assembly of the French Fifth Republic
Deputies of the 4th National Assembly of the French Fifth Republic
Deputies of the 5th National Assembly of the French Fifth Republic